55th NSFC Awards
January 9, 2021

Best Film:
 Nomadland 

The 55th National Society of Film Critics Awards, given on 9 January 2021, honored the best in film for 2020.

Winners
Winners are listed in boldface along with the runner-up positions and counts from the final round:

Best Picture
 Nomadland (52)
 First Cow (50)
 Never Rarely Sometimes Always (41)

Best Director
 Chloé Zhao – Nomadland (58)
 Steve McQueen – Small Axe (41)
 Kelly Reichardt – First Cow (30)

Best Actor
 Delroy Lindo – Da 5 Bloods (52)
 Chadwick Boseman – Ma Rainey's Black Bottom (47)
 Riz Ahmed – Sound of Metal (32)

Best Actress
 Frances McDormand – Nomadland (46)
 Viola Davis – Ma Rainey's Black Bottom (33)
 Sidney Flanigan – Never Rarely Sometimes Always (29)

Best Supporting Actor
 Paul Raci – Sound of Metal (53)
 Glynn Turman – Ma Rainey's Black Bottom (36)
 Chadwick Boseman – Da 5 Bloods (35)

Best Supporting Actress
 Maria Bakalova – Borat Subsequent Moviefilm (47)
 Amanda Seyfried – Mank (40)
 Youn Yuh-jung – Minari (33)

Best Screenplay
 Eliza Hittman – Never Rarely Sometimes Always (38)
 Jonathan Raymond and Kelly Reichardt – First Cow (35)
 Charlie Kaufman – I'm Thinking of Ending Things (29)

Best Cinematography
 Joshua James Richards – Nomadland (47)
 Shabier Kirchner – Lovers Rock (41)
 Leonardo Simões – Vitalina Varela (34)

Best Foreign Language Film
 Collective – Alexander Nanau (38)
 Beanpole – Kantemir Balagov / Bacurau – Kleber Mendonça Filho and Juliano Dornelles (36)

Best Non-Fiction Film
 Time – Garrett Bradley (46)
 City Hall – Frederick Wiseman (28)
 Collective – Alexander Nanau (22)

Film Heritage Award
 Film Comment, founded in 1962 and currently on hiatus, has long been the most substantial and wide-ranging American film magazine.
 Women Make Movies, which, since the 1970s, has been releasing daring and distinctive female-directed movies that more conventional distributors wouldn't touch.
 The Brattle Theatre in Cambridge, Massachusetts. Among America's premier repertory houses, showing arthouse movies steadily since 1953, and holding strong in continuing the time-honored tradition of daily double features.

Dedication
The meeting to decide the winners was dedicated to former Drama Desk president, and film and theater critic William Wolf, who died on March 28, 2020, due to COVID-19. Wolf was a longtime NSFC member whose career spanned Cue and New York magazines as well as his online Wolf Entertainment Guide.

References

External links
 Official website

2020 film awards
2020 in American cinema